Ōrākei is a local government area in Auckland, in New Zealand's Auckland Region. It is governed by the Ōrākei Local Board and Auckland Council. It currently aligns with the council's Ōrākei Ward.

Geography

The Ōrākei Local Board Area includes both the suburb of Ōrākei, and the nearby suburbs of Remuera, Ellerslie, Stonefields, St Johns, Meadowbank, Mission Bay, Kohimarama, St Heliers, Glendowie and Glen Innes. There are town centres in Ellerslie, St Johns, Remuera, Mission Bay and St Heliers.

Geographically, area is situated around the Ōrākei Basin and along a Hauraki Gulf coastline with beaches and cliffs.

History

The area is culturally and spiritually significant to Ngāti Whātua-o-Ōrākei, and includes the tribal group's land, marae, church and urupā.

Takaparawhau-Bastion Point is a cultural site for the iwi, and features an art deco tomb and the memorial garden for former prime minister Michael Joseph Savage.

Much of the area was further developed by Europeans between the First World War and Second World War.

Features

There are a range of beaches and walkways in the area, including the 625 metre Ōrākei Basin walking and cycling track.

The Waiatarua Reserve, the largest urban wetland restoration project in New Zealand, is located in the board area.

References